Jen Heck is an American writer, director, and producer best known for her award-winning films. Her work has appeared at the Whitney Biennial (2004), and at major film festivals including the Sundance Film Festival, the São Paulo International Film Festival, the Palm Springs International Film Festival and the Hamptons International Film Festival. Her stories are often described as "quirky", with themes of love, isolation, and the delicate nature of relationships between young women commonly recurring. Her signature visual style often incorporates found or pre-existing media with rich, original material to create a unique, heavily stylized narrative result.

Her current project, "The Promised Band," is a feature-length documentary about a group of women in Israel and Palestine who start a fake band as a way to explore their taboo friendships. The band is a metaphor for the greater society, with each character playing an archetypal role. The band struggles and fails for the same reasons the society itself struggles and fails, and when the women are able to achieve a modest triumph, the film posits that women in warring societies may be the key to peace. "The Promised Band" premiered at the Cinequest Film Festival in March 2016 and took home both the Award for Best Documentary and the Canon Filmmaker Award.

Heck's work has garnered a number of other awards and nominations as well, including honors from New York Women in Film and Television, the Iris Prize, Zurich's Pink Apple, the Short Movie Awards, the Provincetown International Film Festival, the Big Muddy Film Festival, and Newfest.

She has also worked as a shooter and producer at networks including MTV, VH1, G4/TechTV, Current TV, and Bravo. She has shadow directed on Showtime's Dexter (with Steve Shill) and TNT's Leverage (with Rod Hardy.)

In 2008, Heck traveled to the tallest peak in the world, Mount Everest, where she lived with a professional climbing team as part of her research for an upcoming feature film.

She currently lives in New York City and resides part-time in Los Angeles, California.

Background, education, and early career
Heck grew up in Massachusetts and Singapore, where she attended the Singapore American School. She worked in front of the camera in her early teens, and was featured in national TV commercials before moving permanently behind the scenes in the early 2000s. In 1998, she was the subject of an episode of the Travel Channel's American Journey series. Heck is an avid cyclist and American Journey followed her as she embarked on the Boston-New York AIDSRide, a yearly charitable event for cyclists.

She is a graduate of two prestigious film programs, New York University's Tisch School of the Arts, and Columbia University School of the Arts.

Collaborations and affiliations
Most recently, Heck collaborated with Van Jones and members of musician Prince's family to create a short piece about Prince's secret philanthropic work. The piece featured President Barack Obama, Janelle Monáe, Black Lives Matter co-founder Alicia Garza, and others.

Beginning in 2000, Heck performed as a turntablist and DJ with well-known MCs Cazwell and Crasta Yo for almost two years before leaving their band, Morplay, to pursue film exclusively. That same year she created the 60 Second Film Festival, the first fully online film festival, a groundbreaking event at that time.

In 2001, Heck co-founded Brooklyn-based Charged Animation with filmmakers Scott Rosann, Tunde Adebimpe, Alex Cohn, and Adam Pierce.

In 2004, Heck worked with fine artist Eve Sussman to produce 89 Seconds at Alcazar, a live-action piece based on the 1656 Diego Velázquez painting Las Meninas. Alcazar was an official selection of the 2004 Whitney Biennial and was subsequently purchased by the Museum of Modern Art (MoMA) in New York City. She has also worked with fine artist Mark Tribe on his ongoing Port Huron Project.

In 2006, Heck collaborated with fellow Columbia University film student Madeleine Olnek to write Hold Up, an award-winning short film that was featured at the 2006 Sundance Film Festival. The film also received the Audience Award for favorite short film at Newfest.

Heck has worked with Oscar-nominated Director of Photography Martina Radwan on her films Airplanes, Salamander, and The Promised Band. As a director-cinematographer team, the pair receives generous and ongoing support from Panavision and Canon.

In 2008, she served briefly as an adjunct professor of film at Manhattanville College.

She is currently developing a feature-length version of her award-winning short film "Salamander."

Partial filmography
 The Promised Band, 2016, feature documentary | Winner, Best Documentary Feature, Cinequest Film Festival
 Salamander, 2009, short | Winner, Audience Award, Columbia University Film Festival; Nominated for Iris Prize, Cardiff
 Airplanes, 2007, short | Winner, Best Short Film at Provincetown International Film Festival, The Big Movie Awards, & Zurich Pink Apple
 Hold Up, 2006, short (writer) | Official Selection, Sundance Film Festival; Winner, Best Short Film, Newfest
 The Last Days of Leni Riefenstahl, 2005, short | Winner, Best Short Film, The Big Muddy Film Festival
 89 Seconds at Alcazar, 2004 | Official Selection, 2004 Whitney Biennial

References

External links
 
 
 Jen Heck on Vimeo
 Airplanes at Seattle International Film Festival

1978 births
Living people
American cinematographers
American film producers
Columbia University School of the Arts alumni
American women cinematographers
American women film directors
Writers from Worcester, Massachusetts
Tisch School of the Arts alumni
American women screenwriters
Date of birth missing (living people)
Businesspeople from Worcester, Massachusetts
Film directors from Massachusetts
American women film producers
Screenwriters from Massachusetts